On the Run may refer to:

 "On the run", a phrase often used to describe a fugitive, a person fleeing custody

Literature
 On the Run (novel), by Nina Bawden
 On the Run (novel series), by Gordon Korman
 On the Run, a novel in the Sweet Valley High series
 On the Run, an autobiography by Philip Agee
 On the Run, the tenth book in the Left Behind: The Kids series
 On the Run: Fugitive Life in an American City, a non-fiction work by sociologist Alice Goffman

Film and television
 On the Run (1958 film), a British film starring William Hartnell
 On the Run (1982 film), a U.S. drama featuring Ray Meagher
 On the Run (1988 film), a Hong Kong film starring Yuen Biao
 On the Run (1999 film), a U.S. crime comedy starring Michael Imperioli
 On the Run (2003 film), or Cavale, a French-Belgian film by Lucas Belvaux
 On the Run (TV series), a program on the Discovery Channel
 "On the Run", an episode of Steven Universe
 "On the Run", an episode of Animorphs 
 "On the Run", an episode of The Bionic Woman

Music

Albums 
 On the Run (Jay Chou album), 2007
 On the Run (Children 18:3 album), 2012
 On the Run, a 2009 album by Jason Hartman
 On the Run, a 1986 album by Jon Gibson
 On the Run, Live at the Velvet Lounge, an album by Fred Anderson
 On the Rvn, a 2018 extended play by Young Thug

Tours 
 On the Run (Paul McCartney), a 2011 concert tour by Paul McCartney
 On the Run Tour (Beyoncé and Jay-Z), a 2014 concert tour by Beyoncé and Jay-Z

Songs 
 "On the Run" (instrumental), a 1973 instrumental by Pink Floyd
 "On the Run" (Falco song), 1982
 "On the Run" (Kool G Rap & DJ Polo song)
 "Part II (On the Run)", a song by Jay-Z, featuring Beyoncé
 "On the Run", a song by Blackfoot from Tomcattin'
 "On the Run", a song by Tina Dico from Count to Ten
 "On the Run", a song by Electric Light Orchestra from Discovery
 "On the Run", a song by Natalie Imbruglia from Counting Down the Days
 "On the Run", a song by Manfred Mann's Earth Band from Chance
 "On the Run", a song by OMC from How Bizarre
 "On the Run", a song by Sam Roberts from We Were Born in a Flame
 "On the Run", a song by Royce da 5'9" from Street Hop
 "On the Run", a song by Tamta from Awake
 "On the Run", a song by Toto from Toto XX
 "On the Run", a song from the episode of the same name from Steven Universe

Other uses
 On the Run (convenience store), an international chain owned by ExxonMobil
 On the run (finance), the most recently issued (and hence most liquid) maturity of a contract

See also